Ben Nee-Nee (born 12 May 1993) is a New Zealand rugby union player who plays for the  in the Super Rugby competition. His position of choice is lock.

References

External links 
  Ben Nee Nee @ The Blues

New Zealand rugby union players
1993 births
Living people
New Zealand sportspeople of Samoan descent
Rugby union locks
Auckland rugby union players
Blues (Super Rugby) players
People from Auckland
Samoa international rugby union players
North Harbour rugby union players
Kamaishi Seawaves players
People educated at Botany Downs Secondary College